Jerome Avenue Line refers to the following transit lines:
IRT Jerome Avenue Line (rapid transit)
Jerome Avenue Line (surface) (bus, formerly streetcar)